The APRA Music Awards of 2001 were a group of awards given on 28 May 2001, as one in the series of APRA Awards. These are presented annually by Australasian Performing Right Association (APRA) and the Australasian Mechanical Copyright Owners Society (AMCOS).

Only one classical music award was available in 2001: Most Performed Contemporary Classical Composition. APRA and Australian Music Centre (AMC) established the Classical Music Awards in July of the following year. APRA provided awards for "Best Television Theme", and "Best Film Score" in 2001. These were expanded to The Screen Music Awards presented by APRA and Australian Guild of Screen Composers (AGSC) in November 2002.

Also at the 2001 awards ceremony, APRA celebrated its 75th anniversary by presenting the "ten best and most significant Australian songs of the past 75 years", which together with 20 previously announced songs comprise APRA's Top 30 Australian songs of all time.

Awards 
Nominees and winners with results indicated on the right.

See also 
 Music of Australia

References

External links 
 
 APRA Awards - History

2001 in Australian music
2001 music awards
APRA Awards